Twist with Bobby Darin is an album by American singer Bobby Darin, released in 1961. It reached number 48 on the Billboard 200 and remained there for 31 weeks.

Five of the songs were previously released the year before on For Teenagers Only and the first six were written by Darin himself.

Reception

In his Allmusic review, critic JT Griffith wrote "The dance album is a collection of rock songs, all of which have backbeat suitable for, obviously, twisting... Twist with Bobby Darin was something of a stop-gap album."

Track listing

Side one
"Bullmoose" (Bobby Darin) – 2:31
"Early in the Morning" (Darin, Woody Harris) – 2:17
"Mighty Mighty Men" (Darin) – 1:40
"You Know How" (Darin) – 2:07
"Somebody to Love" (Darin) – 2:19
"Multiplication" (Darin) – 2:18

Side two
"Irresistible You" (Al Kasha, Luther Dixon) – 2:34
"Queen of the Hop" (Harris) – 2:14
"You Must Have Been a Beautiful Baby" (Johnny Mercer, Harry Warren) – 2:11
"Keep a Walkin'" (Howard Greenfield, Neil Sedaka)  – 1:59
"Pity Miss Kitty" (Harris)  – 2:08
"I Ain't Sharin' Sharon" (Doc Pomus, Mort Shuman)  – 2:11

Personnel
Bobby Darin – vocals

References

1961 albums
Bobby Darin albums
Atco Records albums
Albums produced by Ahmet Ertegun